Carsenty may refer to:

 13333 Carsenty, main-belt asteroid
 Uri Carsenty (born 1949), Israeli planetary scientist